Gurindji may refer to:
 Gurindji, Northern Territory, a locality in Australia
Gurindji people, an Australian Aboriginal people
Gurindji language, the language of the Gurindji people
Gurindji Kriol language, the main language now spoken by Gurindji people
The Gurindji strike, also known as the Wave Hill walk-off, a 1966 strike by Gurindji workers at a cattle station 

Gurindji